Sir Matthew Harris (18 September 1841 – 8 June 1917) was an Irish-born Australian politician.

He was born in Magherafelt in County Londonderry to John Harris and Nancy Ann McKee. The family migrated to Sydney in 1842. Harris attended the University of Sydney, receiving a Bachelor of Arts in 1863; he inherited property from his father in 1862. On 4 August 1868 he married Frances Snowdon Lane, with whom he would have eleven children. From 1883 to 1900 he was a Sydney City alderman; he served as Mayor from 1898 to 1900. In 1894 he was elected to the New South Wales Legislative Assembly as the Free Trade member for Sydney-Denison, serving until his retirement in 1901. He was knighted in 1899. Harris died at the Jenner Private Hospital in Potts Point in 1917.

References

 

1841 births
1917 deaths
Members of the New South Wales Legislative Assembly
Free Trade Party politicians
Irish emigrants to colonial Australia
Mayors and Lord Mayors of Sydney
Australian Knights Bachelor
Australian book and manuscript collectors